Woodham may refer to:

Places

Canada
 Woodham, Ontario

England
 Woodham, Buckinghamshire
 Woodham, County Durham
 Woodham, Surrey
 Woodham Ferrers, Essex
 Woodham Mortimer, Essex

Schools
 Woodham Academy, County Durham, England
 Woodham High School, Pensacola, Florida
 Woodham Ley Primary School, Essex, England

Golf Clubs
 Woodham Golf and Country Club, County Durham, United Kingdom

People
 Cecil Woodham-Smith (1896 – 1977), a British historian
 Dai Woodham (1919 – 1994), a British businessman
 Luke Woodham (born 1981), an American murderer

Other uses
 Little Woodham, a living museum in Hampshire, England
 South Woodham Ferrers railway station, Essex, England
 Woodham Brothers scrapyard, in Barry, Wales

See also
 Woodhams